is a high inclination trans-Neptunian object and slow rotator from the outer Solar System, approximately 100 kilometers in diameter. It was first observed at ESO's La Silla Observatory in northern Chile on 30 November 2010.

Orbit and classification 

 orbits the Sun at a distance of 18.8–87.0 AU once every 384 years and 9 months (140,538 days). Its orbit has an eccentricity of 0.65 and an inclination of 70° with respect to the ecliptic.

As of October 2019, it is one of six known objects with inclination (i) > 60° and perihelion (q) > 15 AU, along with the first discovered .

Physical characteristics

Rotation period 

Lightcurve analysis gave a rotation period of 263.8 hours with a brightness amplitude of 0.14 magnitude. It belongs to the Top 200 slowest rotators known to exist.

Diameter and albedo 

It measures 112.7 kilometers in diameter and its surface has an albedo of 0.074. The Collaborative Asteroid Lightcurve Link assumes a standard albedo of 0.10 and calculates a diameter of 100.81 kilometers based on an absolute magnitude of 8.1.

References

External links 
 List Of Centaurs and Scattered-Disk Objects, Minor Planet Center
 
 

Trans-Neptunian objects
Damocloids

Minor planet object articles (unnumbered)
Slow rotating minor planets
20101130